Boomba Ride is an Assamese film directed by Biswajeet Bora. It is written by Biswajeet Bora and Lopamudra Gogoi. The film is about a lower elementary school where Boomba is the only pupil, and the instructors' major issue is to keep the school open.

Plot 
The film is about a lower elementary school where Boomba is the only pupil, and the instructors' major issue is to keep the school open. When things don't go as planned, Boomba uses his upright knowledge to save his school just as it was about to collapse, causing everyone to recognize the positive effects education can have on a community.

Cast 

 Sadagar Daw as Head Teacher
 Dipali Pegu as Boomba's mother
 Hiranya Pegu as Teacher
 Indrajeet Pegu as Boomba

Production 
Boomba Ride is an Indian film production shot in Dergaon, Assam. It has been made by ML Entertainment, Quatermoon Productions. Besides directing, Bora wrote it with his wife Lopamudra Gogoi and produced it with others. Shooting of this film was completed after 13 days of continuous shoot in the month of November and December in 2020 at Golaghat. The film was shot in the Assamese village of Bormukoli in the Golaghat region, where the dominant language is Mising. There, they carefully selected a few individuals who they then trained.

Awards

Reception 

 The 2021 film "Boomba Ride," was fully filmed in the state of Assam, on the banks of the Brahmaputra River, where he spent his formative years. The picture of his youthful hero features Bora. He amplifies his venom, his plots, and his desire to reach the highest point. In Where's My Friend's House, Boomba is Apu's distant cousin, one of Satyajit Ray and Abbas Kiarostami's kids who is imprisoned in a primitive educational system yet driven by an unyielding determination to confront adults' dimwitted viewpoints.
 The way the movie creates its characters gives the movie an identity of its own. Boomba is not as naive as he may appear due to his direct approach to teachers' negotiations with hiss and the humorous results it yields. I also appreciate how each child's persona was given an air of imperfection. They frequently bully, are rude, self-centered, and plagued with self-doubt.

References

External links 

 

2021 films
Assamese-language films